Hochland (German: highland) may refer to:

 Hochland (magazine), a German Catholic magazine (1903–1971)
 Hochland (Warhammer), a game
 Hochland Park, a suburb of the City of Windhoek